Living Sacrifice is an American Christian metal band formed in Little Rock, Arkansas in 1989. The band has released eight studio albums, out of which the first three were recorded under R.E.X. Records with their original vocalist Darren Johnson as a more thrash metal and death metal oriented band. The band evolved into a groove metal and metalcore style beginning with Reborn (1997) under Solid State Records with the original guitarist Bruce Fitzhugh on vocals. In 2003, the group disbanded due to other projects and later their label, Solid State, released their best-of album, In Memoriam (2005). In 2008, Living Sacrifice reformed and released a two-song digital only single called Death Machine. They then began working on The Infinite Order which was released on January 26, 2010. Lance Garvin and Bruce Fitzhugh are the two remaining original members.

History 

Living Sacrifice was one of the first Christian death metal bands along with Sacrament and Mortification. Johnson (bass, vocals), Bruce Fitzhugh (guitar), and Lance Garvin (drums); Jason Truby later joined in on guitar. The band would perform their debut show on December 1, 1989 in front of a hall of nurses. They released a three-song demo in 1990, Not Yielding to Ungodly, which got into the hands of Kurt Bachman and Joey Daub from Believer, who signed them to R.E.X. Records.

In 1991, Living Sacrifice's self-titled debut album was released on R.E.X. Records. The album was recorded at Catamount Recording Studio in Iowa with Kurt Bachman acting as a producer. The album received many comparisons to thrash metal groups of the time, especially Slayer. On November 17, 1992, Living Sacrifice released their second album, Nonexistent. On this album, Living Sacrifice switched from thrash metal to down-tuned death metal, and D.J. started experimenting with a death growl in his vocal approach. The members have said that they were disappointed with the experience of making this album and that the producer was to blame. The producer had no prior experience with working on metal albums and did not know how to work with the band. The band had initially reached out to Scott Burns of Morrisound Recording (Death, Atheist, Obituary), but the label stated the band had to have the album out before Cornerstone Festival of 1992, which did not work with Burns' schedule. Since the engineer was unaware of the proper techniques, Johnson and Garvin attempted to work on the engineering side themselves.

In 1994, the band released a third album, Inhabit, which is considered by some to be the heaviest of all Living Sacrifice albums. On Inhabit, D.J. returned to a more thrash-oriented vocal approach, deeper and lower in tone than his vocals on the band's debut. To support the album, the band embarked on a tour with Malevolent Creation. After this recording R.E.X. went bankrupt, and Living Sacrifice signed onto Solid State Records seeking to widen their audience.

After this, D.J. left the band to follow non-musical ministry, and Bruce took over vocals. Jason's brother, Chris, also joined on bass. With this new lineup, Living Sacrifice recorded Reborn, their Solid State debut, in 1997. The band started to play a mix of groove metal and metalcore. Reborn is considered the most influential of all Living Sacrifice records and earned them a larger non-Christian fanbase. After this record, Chris and Jason left the band and close and longtime friend Jay Stacy filled in on bass while Cory Brandan Putman played on guitar. Stacy has lived down the street from Garvin and had known the band for a longtime. The band embarked on a few tours with the line of Fitzhugh, Garvin, Stacy, and Putman, including a tour with Cannibal Corpse and Angelcorpse. In 1999, Stacy stepped down from the band to focus on his family and was replaced by Arthur Green, formerly of Eso-Charis. Cory played guitar for a tour through Norway and Sweden but was then replaced by Rocky Gray (who would go on to play drums in Evanescence and We Are the Fallen and guitar in Soul Embraced.) At the end of 1999, Matthew Putman joined Living Sacrifice as a percussionist.

In 2000, Living Sacrifice recorded their fifth full-length album, The Hammering Process, with a more rhythmical sound—more oriented towards groove metal. Bruce also sang in one Evanescence song, "Lies". In 2001, A Tribute to Living Sacrifice was released. The album contains covers of many Living Sacrifice songs by other metal bands and former members, and a Living Sacrifice song from a split EP, Metamorphosis, released in 1993. In 2002, Living Sacrifice entered the studio again, resulting in the album Conceived in Fire. In June 2003, Living Sacrifice cancelled the rest of one of their tours and announced that Living Sacrifice was disbanding.

Each of the band members had other commitments, such as Lance Garvin and Rocky Gray's Soul Embraced, and felt it was time to move on. According to several interviews, it was only supposed to be Bruce Fitzhugh's final tour, and after he left, Cory Brandan Putman was supposed to take over Lead Vocals and Rhythm Guitar, and Bryan Gray, formerly of The Blamed was to take over Lead Guitar.

In March 2005, In Memoriam was released by Solid State Records. It is a "best of" album, containing three "newly written and recorded songs by Lance Garvin, Rocky Gray and Bruce Fitzhugh", two songs from each Living Sacrifice album, plus "Enthroned", a 1998 cover of a song originally released on 1992's Nonexistent. The three new songs are "In Christ", "Killers", and "The Power of God".
In 2007, Bruce Fitzhugh was featured on the song "Sixteen", on Demon Hunter's fourth album Storm the Gates of Hell.

On February 4, 2008, a newly created official MySpace page was updated to announce the reformation of the band. They also announced their support of Demon Hunter in the "Stronger Than Hell" tour from May 26 through July 5, 2008. On June 10, 2008, Living Sacrifice released a two-song, online-only sampler, Death Machine. On the same day at the Dallas, Texas date of the "Stronger Than Hell" tour, vocalist and rhythm guitarist Bruce Fitzhugh announced that the band was working on a new CD which they hoped to release in 2009. The album release was delayed by Solid State and eventually came out on January 26, 2010. A music video for their lead single off The Infinite Order, "Rules of Engagement", was aired December 22.

The band's seventh studio album, The Infinite Order, was released January 26, 2010 via Solid State Records. The album features the voices of David Bunton from The Showdown, Joe Musten from Advent and Beloved, and guitarist Jason Truby. The album was mixed and mastered by Andy Sneap, Hell guitarist. Track three references the phrase "God is dead" by Friedrich Nietzsche. Released in November, the deluxe edition contained three additional tracks, two live songs and a new track.

In 2013, after three years of touring, Living Sacrifice recorded their eighth album, Ghost Thief, released November 12, 2013 on Solid State Records. The first song named "The Reaping" was premiered on October 17, 2013 on the Solid State YouTube page. The album features the guest voices of Ryan Clark from Demon Hunter on "Screwtape", and Dave Peters from Throwdown on "Despair". The title song, "Ghost Thief", premiered November 6, 2013 on Revolver magazine website. Living Sacrifice is featured on the Killing Floor 2 Soundtrack. The band performed their first shows of 2017 on the ShipRocked cruise alongside bands such as Pop Evil, Breaking Benjamin, Papa Roach, Sevendust and Lacey Sturm.

According to former vocalist DJ Johnson, a friend of the band's is developing a documentary of the band. In 2017, the band released "New Day" on a benefit compilation, We Bear the Scars. The track was originally supposed to be a part of The Hammering Process, but the band and producer Barry Poynter lost the track during the mixing process. The band's documentary, 30 Years of Sacrifice, was to debut at the band's 30th anniversary show on March 28, 2020, and feature The Blamed, and former members Darren Johnson, Jason and Chris Truby, as well as Embodyment and The Famine drummer Mark Garza on percussion. Due to COVID-19, however, the premiere of the documentary was postponed. 

In 2021, Nordic Mission released a remaster of Living Sacrifice's self-titled debut album for its 30th anniversary. In 2022,  Nordic Mission release a remixed and remaster of Nonexistent on Vinyl and CD.  The second album by the band.

Musical style and legacy 
The band's style has been described as Christian metal, death metal, 
, groove metal,  hardcore punk, metalcore, and grindcore.

Bands that have named Living Sacrifice an influence include: As I Lay Dying, Throwdown, Demon Hunter, Underøath, Haste the Day, Saving Grace, 7 Horns 7 Eyes and many more.

Band members 

Timeline

Discography 

Studio albums

EPs

 Metamorphosis (Split EP with Circle of Dust, 1993)
 Subtle Alliance (2002, Solid State Records)
 Death Machine (2008, independent)

Demos
 Not Yielding to Ungodly (1990)
 Bloodwork & Burn the End (2000)

Compilation
 In Memoriam (best of, compilation, 2005)

DVDs
 In Finite Live (2011)
 30 Years of Sacrifice: The Story of Living Sacrifice (2021)

Other songs
 "Overkill Exposure" (rough mix) (a single track only given out through the 2009 Fuel magazine sampler)
 "Something More" (a single re-recorded track from Reborn put on the Killing Floor 2 Soundtrack)
 "New Day" (a song that was originally supposed to be a part of The Hammering Process but was lost during mixing. It was released finally on We Bear the Scars, a benefit compilation for Timothy Henderson of Warlord)

Music videos

 "...To Nothing" (1992)
 "Reject" (1997)
 "Rules of Engagement" (2009)
 "Overkill Exposure" (2010)

See also 
 List of songs recorded by Living Sacrifice

References

Further reading

External links 

 
 Wilson, Gord (2000) . HM Magazine. Retrieved on August 25, 2016.

American Christian metal musical groups
American death metal musical groups
American groove metal musical groups
Metalcore musical groups from Arkansas
American thrash metal musical groups
Musical groups established in 1989
Musical groups disestablished in 2005
Musical groups reestablished in 2008
Solid State Records artists
Christian extreme metal groups
Christian alternative metal groups
Musical groups from Little Rock, Arkansas
Musical quartets